is a Japanese footballer currently playing as a midfielder for Zweigen Kanazawa.

Career statistics

Club
.

Notes

References

External links

1998 births
Living people
Meiji University alumni
Japanese footballers
Association football midfielders
Sanfrecce Hiroshima players
Zweigen Kanazawa players